Shivani Narayanan is an Indian film and television actress who predominantly works in the Tamil films and television industry. In 2020, she was a contestant on the reality series Bigg Boss 4 Tamil.

Career
Shivani Narayanan made her television debut in 2016 Vijay TV'sPagal Nilavu as Sneha.Initially she was cast in a supporting role but later her character was changed to a lead role after her character was well praised among audiences. Then she was appeared as a guest in Saravanan Meenatchi 3 in which she played the role of Gayathri with negative shades. She next appeared on Jodi Fun Unlimited as a contestant and became a finalist. She appeared in Kadaikutty Singam with the her co-star from Pagal Nilavu. She left that serial and started a new serial in Rettai Roja in a dual role as Anu and Abi, but was replaced by Chandini Tamilarasan. She then concentrated her focus on Instagram where she attained a fabulous fan following.In 2020, she had participated in the Indian reality show Bigg Boss 4 Tamil. Following her popularity she was cast opposite Vijay Sethupathi in the LCU's Vikram starring Kamal Haasan.Next she signed for supporting roles in RJ Balaji's Veetla Vishesham movie and Vadivelu comeback movie Naai Sekar Returns.She is set to make her debut in lead role through the film VJS46 and later it named as DSP.

Filmography

Films

Television

Awards and nominations

References

External links 

Actresses in Tamil television
Actresses in Telugu television
21st-century Indian actresses
Indian film actresses
Child actresses in Malayalam cinema
Bigg Boss (Tamil TV series) contestants
Indian female models
Actresses in Tamil cinema
Actresses in Hindi television
Tamil actresses
Living people
Child actresses in Tamil cinema
2001 births